Oleksiy Hiyovych Helovani (born 20 February 1998) is a Ukrainian professional footballer who plays as a defensive midfielder for Greek club Karaiskakis.

References

External links
 
 
 

1998 births
Living people
Footballers from Donetsk
Ukrainian footballers
Association football midfielders
FC Olimpik Donetsk players
Valmieras FK players
FC Kremin Kremenchuk players
FC Epitsentr Dunaivtsi players
FC Kramatorsk players
A.E. Karaiskakis F.C. players
Ukrainian First League players
Ukrainian Second League players
Latvian Higher League players
Ukrainian expatriate footballers
Expatriate footballers in Latvia
Ukrainian expatriate sportspeople in Latvia
Expatriate footballers in Greece
Ukrainian expatriate sportspeople in Greece